Stefania ackawaio is a species of frog in the family Hemiphractidae.
It is endemic to Guyana.
Its natural habitat is subtropical or tropical moist montane forests.

References

Sources
MacCulloch, R. and A. Lathrop. (2002). Exceptional diversity of Stefania (Anura: Hylidae) on Mount Ayanganna, Guyana: three new species and new distribution records. Herpetologica 58: 327–346.
MacCulloch, R. and A. Lathrop. (2006). Stefania ackawaio. Catalogue of American Amphibians and Reptiles 824: 1–2.
MacCulloch, R.D., A. Lathrop and S.Z. Khan. (2006). Exceptional diversity of Stefania (Anura: Cryptobatrachidae) II: six species from Mount Wokomung, Guyana. Phyllomedusa 5: 31–41.

Stefania
Endemic fauna of Guyana
Taxonomy articles created by Polbot
Amphibians described in 2002